The Missionary Congregation of Saint Andrew the Apostle (С.M.S.A.A.)  is a congregation of the Ukrainian Greek Catholic Church that is present in Ukraine and Italy and that has its Mother House in Ivano-Frankivsk, Ukraine. The congregation was established as eparchial right in the Ukrainian Catholic Eparchy of Ivano-Frankivsk by Fr. Irineusz Michalik on 30 November 1997 with benediction of the Eparchial Bishop emeritus Sofron Dmyterko, O.S.B.M.

History
After the collapse of the Soviet Union the religious life became to flourish in the Ukrainian Greek Catholic Church in independent Ukraine. Some old communities have been restored and new ones established. In 1997 among them was founded a new missionary congregation under patronage of St. Andrew the Apostle, who is considered in the early Christian history of Ukraine as missionary and preacher on the southern borders of modern-day Ukraine, along the Black Sea. Founder is Fr. Irineusz Mariusz Michalik, who was born in 1967 in Poland, but was ordained as Ukrainian Greek Catholic priest for the Eparchy of Ivano-Frankivsk.

Notable members
Yosafat Moschych, Superior General (2003–2013) and auxiliary bishop of the Ukrainian Catholic Archeparchy of Ivano-Frankivsk (since 2014).

References

External links
Profile at gcatholic.org

Ukrainian Greek Catholic Church
Eastern Catholic orders and societies
Christian religious orders established in the 20th century
Christian missionary societies
Christian organizations established in 1997